The Yazoo City Municipal School District is a public school district based in Yazoo City, Mississippi (USA).

The district boundaries parallel that of Yazoo City.

History 
In 2019, the school district was taken over by the Mississippi Department of Education and was placed into the Mississippi Achievement School District. The district is still considered a separate entity.

Schools
Yazoo City High School
Woolfolk Middle School
McCoy Elementary School 
Webster Elementary School

Demographics

2007-08 school year
There were a total of 2,822 students enrolled in the Yazoo City Municipal School District during the 2007–2008 school year. The gender makeup of the district was 49% female and 51% male. The racial makeup of the district was 99.17% African American, 0.54% White, 0.07% Native American, 0.14% Hispanic, and 0.07% Asian.

Previous school years

Accountability statistics

See also

List of school districts in Mississippi
Yazoo County School District

References

External links
Yazoo City Municipal School District

Education in Yazoo County, Mississippi
School districts in Mississippi